A counterplot refers to a plot made in opposition to another. It may also refer to:

 Counterplot (film), a 1959 crime film
 The Counterplot, a 1924 novel by Hope Mirrlees
 "Counter Plot", fifth episode of the 1965–66 Doctor Who serial The Daleks' Master Plan
 The Counterplot, an episode of the 1919 serial The Lightning Raider

See also 
 L'Étourdi ou les Contretemps - A French play meaning "The Blunderer, or the Counterplots"
 V.V., or Plots and Counterplots - A 1865 short story by Louisa May Alcott
 Counterpoint (disambiguation)